Metriochroa fraxinella is a moth of the family Gracillariidae. It is known from Japan (Honshū, Kyūshū and the Ogasawara Islands).

The wingspan is 5.2-8.2 mm. There are at least two generations per year in temperate Japan (Honshū and Kyūshū), because adults are on wing in summer (from June to July) and in autumn (from late September to early October).

The larvae feed on Fraxinus species (including Fraxinus sieboldiana), Ligustrum japonicum and Ligustrum micranthum. They mine the leaves of their host plant. The mine is found under the upper cuticle of the leaves. It is narrowly linear, very long, irregularly curved, and sometimes occupying the whole leaf surface. It is whitish with a brownish central line of frass. Pupation takes place within the mine in a pupal chamber that is located at the end of the mine. This chamber is ellipsoidal, with a strongly swollen lower side and a wrinkled upper side.

References

Phyllocnistinae
Moths of Japan